Kapenguria Constituency is an electoral constituency in Kenya. It is one of four constituencies of West Pokot County. The constituency was established for the 1988 elections.

Members of Parliament

Locations and wards

References 

Constituencies in West Pokot County
Constituencies in Rift Valley Province
1988 establishments in Kenya
Constituencies established in 1988